Snug may refer to:

 Snug (A Midsummer Night's Dream), a character in Shakespeare's A Midsummer Night's Dream
 Snug (piercing), a type of piercing
 Snug, Tasmania, a small town on the D'Entrecasteaux Channel, in the municipality of Kingborough in Tasmania
 Snug Corner, a town on Acklins island, Bahamas
 Snug, a den or small room
 Snug, a character in the webcomic Ugly Hill
 Snug, a small private room within a public house